Grant Park refers to both a neighborhood and public park in the Northeast section of Portland, Oregon. The neighborhood is bordered by Alameda and Beaumont-Wilshire to the north; Rose City Park to the east; Hollywood District, Laurelhurst, and Sullivan's Gulch to the south; and Irvington to the west.

It is best known for its association with Beverly Cleary's Klickitat Street series of books, which are set in the neighborhood. Houses in the neighborhood generally date to the early 20th century, and are primarily of the Old Portland or Craftsman styles. There is a park of the same name, which is connected to Grant High School.

References

External links
 
 Grant Park Neighborhood Association
 Grant Park Neighborhood Association on Facebook
Grant Park Street Tree Inventory Report

 
Neighborhoods in Portland, Oregon